Ernst Johann Schmitz (18 May 1845 – 3 December 1922) was a German naturalist, ornithologist, entomologist and Roman Catholic priest who settled in Madeira in the late 1870s, serving as vice chancellor of the Funchal Seminary from 1891 to 1898, and again from 1902 to 1908, becoming a naturalised Portuguese citizen.  From 1898 to 1902 he worked in Belgium.  In 1908 he moved to Palestine to manage the Hospice of St Paul in Jerusalem until 1914, subsequently working in similar positions in Tabgha, Damascus and finally Haifa where he died. 

Schmitz is known for his extensive natural history studies, both on the island of Madeira, where he described the Madeiran wood pigeon and Zino's petrel as well as studying the local ants, and in Palestine. He was especially known for his extensive natural collection of Holy Land animals. This collection was considered lost after Schmitz's death, until found by chance at a cellar in Old Jerusalem in the 1970s. The Schmitz Natural Collection is now presented at the Steinhardt Museum of Natural History in Tel Aviv.

References

 Gunnar Anger. (2004). “Ernst Johann Schmitz”. In: Biographisch-Bibliographisches Kirchenlexikon Volume 23. Nordhausen.  (in German).
 Madeira Birds
 http://aprenderamadeira.net/schmitz-ernst-johann/  (in Portuguese)
 Schmitz, E., C.M. & Nusselein, E.W., (ed.). 1986. Aus meinem Leben: Plaudereien eines alten Missionars. Erschienen von 1932–34 in siebzehn Fortsetzungen des Monatsblatt der deutschen Lazaristen "Sankt Vinzenz". Selbstauflage, Aachen. (in German)

Further reading
 Yossi Leshem, Haim Goren, Hana Amit (ed.). 2018. Pater Ernst Schmitz: Geistlicher und Zoologe. Das Heilige Land zu Beginn den 20. Jahrhunderts (in German)
 Haim Goren. 2005. Real Catholics and Good Germans. The German Catholics and Palestine, 1838–1910. Magnes.  (in Hebrew)

1845 births
1922 deaths
German ornithologists
German entomologists
19th-century German Roman Catholic priests
People from Madeira
20th-century Portuguese Roman Catholic priests